Brauhaus am Kreuzberg is a brewery based in Kreuzberg, Hallerndorf, Germany founded in 1461. It operates Friedels Keller, an on-site beer cellar. Its products and services include:
beer brewery
distillery
Beer cellar and restaurant.

In 1461 the family Friedel started brewing in Hallerndorfer district Schnaid.

Today the brewery produces various beers including
Zwickelbier
Wheat beer
Pilsner, etc.

See also 
List of oldest companies

References 

Article contains text translated from Brauhaus am Kreuzberg from German Wikipedia retrieved on 25 February 2017.

External links 
Homepage

Breweries in Germany
Beer brands of Germany
Companies based in Bavaria
Companies established in the 15th century
15th-century establishments in the Holy Roman Empire